Olivier Durocher (1844 – September 3, 1931) was mayor of the city of Ottawa, Ontario, Canada from 1892 to 1893.

He was born in Saint-Antoine, Quebec in 1844 and moved to Ottawa around 1861. He apprenticed as a shoemaker, later opening his own business. He served on city council for 8 years.

References 

Chain of Office: Biographical Sketches of the Early Mayors of Ottawa (1847-1948), Dave Mullington

1844 births
1931 deaths
Mayors of Ottawa
Franco-Ontarian people